Chelsea 7750 is a surviving 1913 American silent crime drama film directed by J. Searle Dawley and starring Henry E. Dixey (from the stage), Laura Sawyer, and House Peters. It was the fourth of six "Kate Kirby's Cases" detective stories made in 1913, the first produced by the Famous Players Film Company after Dawley and Sawyer left Edison for Famous Players.

Cast
 Henry E. Dixey as Detective Kirby
 Laura Sawyer as Kirby's Daughter
 House Peters as Professor Grimble
 Martin Faust as Grimble's son

Preservation status
A print is held by the BFI National Film and Television Archive, London.

Kate Kirby's cases 
 The Diamond Crown. (Edison – 1913) 
 On the Broad Stairway. (Edison – 1913) 
 The Substitute Stenographer. (Edison – 1913) 
 Chelsea 7750. (Famous Players  - 1913)
 An Hour Before Dawn. (Famous Players  - 1913)
 The Port of Doom. (Famous Players  - 1913)

References

External links
 
 

1913 films
American silent feature films
Films directed by J. Searle Dawley
American black-and-white films
American crime drama films
1910s crime drama films
1913 drama films
1910s American films
Silent American drama films
1910s English-language films